Artemisia pipe is a diamond bearing diatreme in the Slave craton region of northern Northwest Territories, Canada.

See also
List of volcanoes in Canada
Volcanism of Canada
Volcanism of Northern Canada

References

Diatremes of the Northwest Territories
Pre-Holocene volcanoes